Solar power in Myanmar has the potential to generate 51,973.8 TWh/year, with an average of over 5 sun hours per day. Even though most electricity is produced from hydropower in Myanmar, the country has rich technical solar power potential that is the highest in the Greater Mekong Subregion; however, in terms of installed capacity Myanmar lags largely behind Thailand and Vietnam.  

The country aims to generate 8% of electricity through renewable energy sources—through wind and solar energy—by 2021 and 12% by 2025. In general, foreign direct investment in renewable energy in Myanmar was very limited during the period of 2012-2018.

In rural areas, photovoltaics are used for charging batteries and pumping water. 70% of the Burmese population of 50 million live in rural areas.

Myanmar's opened its first solar power plant in Minbu, Magway Division, in November 2018. The plant will produce 40 megawatts (MW) of electricity in its first phase of operations and will produce 170 MW once fully operational.

The country has plans to build two solar energy plants—in Myingyan and Wundwin in Mandalay Division—each to have a generation capacity of 150 MW.

To accelerate the development of solar energy in the country, Myanmar needs to improve renewable energy governance, build an effective regulatory framework for renewable energy and simplify the business environment for investors. As of 2021, Myanmar is not yet a member of the International Renewable Energy Agency (IRENA), an international organization that facilitates cooperation and promotes the adoption of renewable energy; joining IRENA could help Myanmar receive external support and attract more investment in renewables.

See also
Energy in Myanmar

References

Energy in Myanmar
Myanmar